Alexander Manoogian (June 28, 1901 – July 10, 1996) was an Armenian-American industrial engineer, businessman, entrepreneur and philanthropist who spent most of his career in Detroit, Michigan. He was the founder of the Masco Corporation, which in 1969 was listed on the NYSE (XNYS:MAS). In 1954, he patented and brought to market the first successful washerless ball valve faucet, the Delta faucet, named for the faucet cam shaped like the fourth letter of the Greek alphabet.

He and his wife Marie donated the Manoogian Mansion to the city of Detroit, which uses it as the official residence of the Mayor of Detroit. In addition to donations to local universities, the Manoogians donated substantial amounts of money to churches, educational institutions and charities of the Armenian Diaspora to preserve and continue their culture.

Career
Arriving in Bridgeport, Connecticut, in 1920, Manoogian began working as a machinist. He also worked for short periods in Rhode Island and in Massachusetts. In time, he was joined by his parents, two brothers and two sisters.

Manoogian and his family moved to Detroit, Michigan, in 1924, attracted to opportunities in the booming auto industry. After gaining more experience, in 1929 he founded the Masco Screw Company, later known as Masco Corporation. By 1936, in the midst of the Great Depression, Manoogian had expanded Masco to the point that it was listed on the New York Stock Exchange (NYSE).  Manoogian's redesign and production of the Delta faucet, which allowed one-handed use, resulted in best-selling status for the plumbing fixture and generated substantial profits for his business. In 1995, his company had $3 billion in sales and had 38 percent of the domestic market for faucets.

Marriage and family
Manoogian married Marie Tatian (1902–1993), also an Armenian immigrant. Their daughter Louise Manoogian Simone (1933-2019) succeeded him as President of AGBU (see below). Their son Richard A. Manoogian (b. 1936) was CEO of the family business Masco and is a major collector of American art.

Philanthropy and civic organizations

Manoogian contributed generously to charitable organizations and educational institutions, especially to the Armenian General Benevolent Union (AGBU). In recognition, he was voted Life President in 1970 and Honorary Life President in 1989. Manoogian was also active in the Knights of Vartan; in 1940 he was elected its Avak Sparapet (National Commander).

In 1968 he established the AGBU Alex and Marie Manoogian Cultural Fund. The fund, seeded with a  $1 million endowment, is devoted to the publication and translation of Armenian scholarly and literary works, and Armenian cultural material worldwide.

Through the AGBU, the Manoogians funded schools for ethnic Armenians in Southfield, Michigan; Los Angeles, California; Buenos Aires, Argentina; Sydney, Australia; Beirut, Lebanon; Zahle, Lebanon; Egypt; Tehran, Iran; Montreal, Quebec; Toronto, Ontario; and Montevideo, Uruguay (all are named for the Manoogian family).  Manoogian also funded numerous Armenian churches, cultural centers, university chairs for Armenian studies and museums worldwide. He donated generously to Wayne State University in Detroit.

Marie Manoogian died in 1993, and Alex in 1996.  They were first interred in Detroit, Michigan. In 2007 they were reinterred with state honors in Armenia (see below).

Legacy and honors

Manoogian Hall, Wayne State's center for international language and linguistics, is named after him.
In 1966 the Manoogians donated their mansion to the city of Detroit.  It is used today as the mayoral residence.
In 1982 Alex and Marie Manoogian donated funds for the construction of a museum in their name, the Treasury House Museum, on the grounds of the Mother See of Holy Etchmiadzin in Armenia.
1990, was awarded the Ellis Island Medial of Honor. 
1993, Alex Manoogian was named a National Hero of Armenia and a citizen of Armenia by President Levon Ter Petrosian, the first person outside the country to be so honored.
2007, at the invitation of the government of Armenia and the Armenian Apostolic Church, the remains of Marie and Alex Manoogian were moved and reinterred with full state honors on the grounds of Holy Etchmiadzin, in front of the Treasury Museum. The Archbishop, national officials and Louise Manoogian Simone, Richard Manoogian and others of their family attended the ceremony; the two children were among the speakers.
Alex Manoogian streets in Yerevan, the capital of Armenia; in Montreal, Quebec, Canada; and in Stepanakert, the capital of Nagorno-Karabakh, were named in his honor.

References

External links

 Steve Takesian, "Alex Manoogian", Find A Grave 
 

1901 births
1996 deaths
American people of Armenian descent
Armenian businesspeople
Ethnic Armenian businesspeople
Armenian inventors
Philanthropists from Michigan
Smyrniote Armenians
Emigrants from the Ottoman Empire to the United States
People from İzmir
Businesspeople from Detroit
Presidents of the Armenian General Benevolent Union
National Hero of Armenia
20th-century American businesspeople
Armenian genocide survivors
20th-century American inventors
20th-century American philanthropists